Sondre is a Norwegian masculine given name. The name began to become more common in the 1960s, and became roughly twelve times as popular from 1980 to 1990 before declining in popularity thereafter. As of 2017, there were 9,111 men in Norway with Sondre as part of their forename, and 8,092 with Sondre as their only forename. People with this name include:

Musicians
Sondre Bratland (born 1938), Norwegian folk singer
Sondre Meisfjord (born 1975), Norwegian folk and jazz musician
Sondre Lerche (born 1982), Norwegian singer, songwriter, and guitarist
Sondre Justad (born 1990), Norwegian songwriter

Footballers
Sondre Auklend (born 2003), Norwegian football midfielder
Sondre Bjørshol (born 1994), Norwegian football defender
Sondre Brunstad Fet (born 1997), Norwegian football midfielder
Sondre Jensen (born 1971), Norwegian footballer
Sondre Johansen (born 1995), Norwegian football defender
Sondre Kåfjord (born 1943), Norwegian football official
Sondre Liseth (born 1997), Norwegian football forward
Sondre Rossbach (born 1996), Norwegian football goalkeeper
Sondre Sørli (born 1995), Norwegian football midfielder
Sondre Sørløkk (born 1997), Norwegian football midfielder
Sondre Tronstad (born 1995), Norwegian football midfielder

Other sportspeople
Sondre Norheim (1825–1897), Norwegian skier
Sondre Nordstad Moen (born 1991), Norwegian long distance runner
Sondre Olden (born 1992), Norwegian ice hockey player
Sondre Holst Enger (born 1993), Norwegian cyclist
Sondre Turvoll Fossli (born 1993), Norwegian cross-country skier
Sondre Ringen (born 1996), Norwegian ski jumper
Sondre Oddvoll Bøe (born 1998), Norwegian figure skater
Sondre Guttormsen (born 1990), Norwegian pole vaulter

See also
Håkon, Kristin and Sondre, the mascots of the 1994 Winter Olympics and 1994 Winter Paralympics

References

Norwegian masculine given names